The Borgias, also known as the Borjas, were a European papal family of Spanish origin that became prominent during the Renaissance.  The family produced three popes of the Catholic Church:

 Pope Callixtus III (born Alfons de Borja; 1378–1458) served as pope from 8 April 1455 until his death on 6 August 1458
 Pope Alexander VI (born Rodrigo Lanzol Borgia; 1431–1503) served as pope from 11 August 1492 until his death on 18 August 1503; his maternal uncle was Pope Callixtus III
 Pope Innocent X (born Giovanni Battista Pamphilj (or Pamphili); 1574–1655) served as pope from 15 September 1644 until his death on 7 January 1655; he was the great-great-great-grandson of Pope Alexander VI, but his surname was not Borgia

See also

 List of popes
 Route of the Borgias

References

Popes
Popes
Popes
 
Popes
Borgia